Louis Christophe Auguste Allmer (8 July 1815 – 27 November 1899) was a 19th-century French historian and epigrapher. He contributed with Paul Dissard to change a fledgling science by confronting archaeological evidence and providing a reference documentation.

Biography 
Like his father, he became tax collector in 1835 for the Ministry of Finance, among others in Saint-Priest (Rhône). Then, when he retired in 1868, he devoted himself to epigraphy and archeology. He was particularly interested in Roman remains unearthed by the drilling of the PLM line in Lyon. In his time he was one of the leading specialists of Latin epigraphy, in the tradition of Léon Renier.

On 2 April 1875, he was made a chevalier of the Légion d'honneur as author of significant work in the field of archeology.

From 1876, he became correspondent member of the Académie des inscriptions et belles-lettres. Two years later, the city of Lyon appointed him a curator of its museums of epigraphy, numismatics and sigillography.

Main publications 

1858: Sur quelques inscriptions antiques,
1875: (u/dir.) Atlas des inscriptions antiques et du Moyen Age de Vienne en Dauphiné, drawing by Adrien Allmer, 
1887–1888:  Trion , 
1888–1893: Inscriptions antiques. Musée de Lyon, tome I à V,
1889: (u/dir.) Les gestes du Dieu Auguste,
1893: (u/dir.)  Inscriptions antiques de Nîmes,

References

External links 
 August Allmer on Data.bnf.fr
 Auguste Allmer, sa vie, son œuvre, 1900 by Joseph Buche on Persée

19th-century French historians
French epigraphers
1815 births
Scientists from Paris
1899 deaths
Chevaliers of the Légion d'honneur